The 2021–22 season was the 113th season in the existence of Fenerbahçe S.K. and the club's 64th consecutive season in the top flight of Turkish football. In addition to the domestic league, Fenerbahçe participated in this season's editions of the Turkish Cup, the UEFA Europa League and the UEFA Europa Conference League.

Kits
Fenerbahçe's 2021–22 kits, manufactured by Puma, released on 9 July 2021 and were up for sale on the same day.

Supplier: Puma
Main sponsor: Avis

Back sponsor: Halley
Sleeve sponsor: Nesine.com

Short sponsor: Aygaz
Socks sponsor: Floki Inu

Players

First-team squad

Transfers

In

Notes:
 In the 2020–21 season, Samatta joined Fenerbahçe for €6M on an initial loan deal until the end of the season.

Out

Total spending:  €4.35M 

Total income:  €2.30M 

Expenditure:  €2.05M

New contracts

Pre-season and friendlies

Pre-season

Mid-season

Competitions

Overview

Süper Lig

League table

Results summary

Pld = Matches played; W = Matches won; D = Matches drawn; L = Matches lost; GF = Goals for; GA = Goals against; GD = Goal difference; Pts = Points

Results by round

Matches

Turkish Cup

UEFA Europa League

Play-off round

Group stage

The group stage draw was held on 27 August 2021.

UEFA Europa Conference League

Knockout phase

Knockout round play-offs
The draw for the knockout round play-offs was held on 13 December 2021.

Statistics

Appearances and goals

|-
! colspan=14 style=background:#dcdcdc; text-align:center| Goalkeepers

|-
! colspan=14 style=background:#dcdcdc; text-align:center| Defenders

|-
! colspan=14 style=background:#dcdcdc; text-align:center| Midfielders

|-
! colspan=14 style=background:#dcdcdc; text-align:center| Forwards

|-
! colspan=14 style=background:#dcdcdc; text-align:center| Players transferred/loaned out during the season

|}

Goalscorers

Assists

Clean sheets

Disciplinary record

Notes

References

Fenerbahçe S.K. (football) seasons
Fenerbahçe